The Montes de León (Spanish for "mountains of León", named after the ancient Kingdom of León) is a mountain range in north-western Spain, in the provinces of León and Zamora. This range is located at the confluence of the Cantabrian Mountains and the Macizo Galaico. The summits of the range are often covered with snow in the winter.

Other important summits are Cabeza de la Yegua , Peña Trevinca  and Vizcodillo .

The Sierra de la Cabrera is a subrange of the Montes de León.

See also
Cantabrian Mountains
Cave of Valporquero (in the Montes de León range)
Galician Massif

External links
Macizo Galaico (Chain) - Hiking Geographic Card

Leon
Mountain ranges of Castile and León